Believing The Lie is a crime novel by Elizabeth George. It reached third place on the 2012 best sellers list of The New York Times.

References

External links
 Review on Publishers Weekly.

2012 American novels
American mystery novels
E. P. Dutton books
Hodder & Stoughton books